The .30 Thompson Center (7.62×48 mm), designated 30 THOMPSON CENTER by SAAMI, 30 TC by the C.I.P., is a centerfire rifle cartridge developed for Thompson Center Arms by Hornady intended to deliver  .30-06 Springfield performance in a .308 Winchester length round.

It was initially offered in the Icon series of bolt-action rifles in 2007, which were released at the same time. 

While it did accomplish its goal, consumer acceptance was low, and the round has remained on the sidelines. The 6.5mm Creedmoor cartridge was created by necking down the .30 TC, and has achieved widespread popularity.

It is the first Thompson Center headstamped cartridge.

Overview
As it has been understood that propellant burns more efficiently in shorter, wider-diameter casings, modern ammunition has changed over time to become shorter and wider than previous cartridges.

The .30 TC (0.308 in (7.8 mm) x 1.920 in (48.8 mm) is a non-magnum that is somewhat shorter and wider than the .308 and .30-06. The .30 TC has speed and energy equal to the .30-06. 

All three cartridges weigh approximately the same, but the .30 TC produces less recoil. The case length of the .30 TC is 1.92 inches. Although it is somewhat shorter than the .308, the .30 TC fires a 150-grain SST bullet nearly 200 fps faster. The .30 TC also propels the 150-grain SST faster than the 2.494" .30-06.

When loaded with the 165-grain SST bullets, the .30 TC has a 50 fps advantage over the .30-06, which has a velocity of 2,850 fps.

References

30 TC
Products introduced in 2007